Mamitupo is a town in the indigenous province of Guna Yala in Panama.

Sources 

World Gazetteer: Panama

Populated places in Guna Yala